Steel Rose is a manhua - a  Chinese-language comic.

Overview
Taekwondo Olympic gold medalist Lee Le Ting strikes terror into others with her arrogance and brutal fists. Little does she know she has captured the heart of a wealthy, handsome European bachelor, Louis, who has been infatuated with her since their first meeting. It's hate at first sight for Le Ting as she is disgusted by pretty boys! But Louis does all he can to bring himself closer to her.

Characters 
 Lee Le Ting : an 18-year-old taekwondo champion from Taiwan. Le Ting runs away to New York after having a big spat with her grandfather, who disagrees with her plan to retire from taekwondo entirely. She mistakes Louis for a robber on the street and punches him landing him in the hospital. She was pulled into shooting an advertisement and becoming the spokesperson for the clothing company Xanadu by Louis as compensation for the hospital fees. Sees Louis as a sissy and overwhelmingly annoying.
 Louis Lorenzo : A well sought after European bachelor who only has eyes for Le Ting. He has a strangely optimistic and happy-go-lucky personality even in the worst situations. He pulls Le Ting into the advertisement under the pretense of repaying him but actually is only using it as an excuse to try to get closer to her.  Affectionately called "Lulu" by Jiayu.

Although he was adopted by Yung Jo's parents, he treats Yung Jo as a real brother. His biological father is Cloud's father, who had a passionate love affair with his then 15-year-old mother, Isabella, making Cloud his half brother. As he grew older, his mother came back for him and brought him to his biological father. His mother had become a fashion designer, and because there was no one to model the appearance in full clothing and makeup of the "Charlotte" doll, she had Louis do it temporarily. Accidentally, Cloud saw "Charlotte" who was really Louis in disguise.

 Cloud : Louis' rival. They were schoolmates since middle school. He is CEO of Xanadu Clothing Company. It seems he has something called the "Charlotte's curse"; something only he and Louis know about. Later it is revealed Cloud has had a longtime infatuation with a girl named Charlotte who he saw briefly by chance when he was younger. He did not realize at the time it was Louis dressed up as Charlotte. He believes Louis stole Charlotte away from him. Cloud holds a deep resentment for Louis because of this, as well as Louis being the favored son of their father.
 Ding Jiayu : Le Ting's best friend who is a photographer.
 Yung Jo/Juliano Lorenzo : a photographer who is Jiayu's boyfriend. He is half Chinese. Louis is his brother, but they do not share the same blood because Yung Jo's father adopted Louis as his own.
 Isabella Fauchon : Louis' biological mother whom he took his looks after. She left him in Yung Jo's father, Emilio's adoptive care after she realized she wasn't financially stable enough to look after her son as a single mother. When she reunited with the adolescent Louis, she had already become an internationally famous wedding dress designer.
 Andrea/Angela : Chosen by Cloud to be spokesperson for Xanadu along with Le Ting. She is an Olympic gold medalist in gymnastics representing Romania. Only 145 cm tall.
 Marcus : Louis' assistant. His first assignment is the Xanadu photoshoot, which he is increasingly nervous about.
 Zhang Fen Fang : Jiayu's mother.

Taiwanese comics titles
2000 comics debuts